Germany competed at the 1896 Summer Olympics in Athens, Greece.
The Germans were the third most successful nation in terms of both gold medals (6 plus 1 as part of a mixed team) and total medals (13).  Gymnastics was the sport in which Germany excelled.  The German team had 19 athletes.  The Germans had 75 entries in 26 events (of which 48 entries were in the 8 gymnastics events), taking 13 medals.

Medalists

Medals awarded to participants of mixed-NOC teams are represented in italics. These medals are not counted towards the individual NOC medal tally.

Multiple medalists
The following competitors won multiple medals at the 1896 Olympic Games.

Competitors

| width=78% align=left valign=top |
The following is the list of number of competitors in the Games.

| width="22%" align="left" valign="top" |

Athletics

Hofmann's silver medal in the 100 metres was the only medal earned by the German athletes, though they finished 4th or 5th an additional 4 times. Alfred Flatow was entered in the 100 metres but did not start.

Track & road events

Field events

Cycling

Track

Road

Gymnastics

Germany dominated the gymnastics program, taking 5 of the 8 gold medals and medalling in each event.

Team

Individual

Tennis

Traun was defeated by Boland in the first round of the singles tournament.  The two entered the doubles tournament as a pair, winning the gold medal in that competition as part of a mixed team; that medal is not counted for Germany.

Weightlifting

Schuhmann's lift was equal to that of the bronze medallist, but lifting form was used as a tie-breaker in the event.

Wrestling

Schuhmann first faced Launceston Elliot, the one-handed lift weightlifting champion, defeating him fairly easily.  He received a bye in the semifinals, to face Georgios Tsitas in the final match.  That contest took two days, after it had been postponed on account of darkness 40 minutes into the first day.  Schuhmann quickly won on the second morning.

References

  (Digitally available at )
  (Excerpt available at )
 

Nations at the 1896 Summer Olympics
1896
Olympics